AGEH Gymnastikos B.C. is a Greek professional basketball club that is located in Chalkida, Greece.

History
AGEH Gymnastikos was founded in 1976, as AGE Chalkida. In 2010, it merged with Gymnastikos Syllogos Chalkida, to form AGEH Gymnastikos. The club competed in the Greek 2nd Division, during the period 2001–2008. In the 2008–09 and 2009-10 seasons, the club was relegated in two straight seasons, and ended up in the Greek local regional divisions.

In 2013, the club was dissolved because of financial problems. The club returned in 2017.

Arena
AGEH plays its home games at the Tasos Kampouris Kanithou Indoor Hall, which is also located on the island of Euboea, in Chalcis, and has a seating capacity of 1,620 people.

Notable players

  Fotis Vasilopoulos
  Makis Dreliozis
  Fanis Koumpouras
  Alexis Falekas
  Andronikos Gizogiannis
  Ioannis Psathas

Head coaches
  Vangelis Angelou
  Kostas Missas

References

External links
Eurobasket.com team page

Basketball teams in Greece
Basketball teams established in 1976